Fire of Love is a 1925 German silent film directed by Paul L. Stein and starring Liane Haid, Alfons Fryland, and Walter Rilla.

The film's sets were designed by the art director Walter Reimann. It was distributed by the major studio UFA.

Cast

References

Bibliography

External links

1925 films
Films of the Weimar Republic
Films directed by Paul L. Stein
German silent feature films
UFA GmbH films
German black-and-white films